Fathabad (also Romanized as Fatḩābād) is a city in Vardasht Rural District, in the Central District of Semirom County, Isfahan Province, Iran. At the 2006 census, its population was 1,218, in 283 families.

References 

Populated places in Semirom County